The Kingdom of Greece was ruled by the House of Wittelsbach from 1832 to 1862 and by the House of Glücksburg from 1863 to 1924 and, after being temporarily abolished in favour of the Second Hellenic Republic, again from 1935 to 1973, when it was once more abolished and replaced by the Third Hellenic Republic.

Only the first king, Otto, was actually styled King of Greece. His successor, George I, was styled King of the Hellenes, as were all other modern Greek monarchs.

The Greek monarchy was definitively abolished weeks before the referendum in 1973 conducted under the auspices of the then-ruling military regime, which confirmed the abolishment. It was re-confirmed by a second referendum in 1974, after the restoration of democratic rule.

House of Wittelsbach

The London Conference of 1832 was an international conference convened to establish a stable government in Greece. Negotiations between the three Great Powers (United Kingdom, France and Russia) resulted in the establishment of the Kingdom of Greece under a Bavarian Prince. The decisions were ratified in the Treaty of Constantinople later that year.

The convention offered the throne to the Bavarian Prince, Otto. They also established the line of succession which would pass the crown to Otto's descendants, or his younger brothers should he have no issue. It was also decided that in no case would there be a personal union of the crowns of Greece and Bavaria.

House of Schleswig-Holstein-Sonderburg-Glücksburg

In October 1862, King Otto was deposed in a popular revolt, but while the Greek people rejected Otto, they did not seem averse to the concept of monarchy per se. Many Greeks, seeking closer ties to the pre-eminent world power, the United Kingdom, rallied around the idea that Prince Alfred, the second son of Queen Victoria and Prince Albert, could become the next King. British Foreign Secretary Lord Palmerston believed that the Greeks were "panting for increase in territory", hoping that the election of Alfred as King would also result in the incorporation of the Ionian Islands, which were then a British protectorate, into an enlarged Greek state.

The London Conference of 1832, however, had prohibited any of the Great Powers' ruling families from accepting the crown of Greece, and in any event, Queen Victoria was adamantly opposed to the idea. Nevertheless, the Greeks insisted on holding a referendum on the issue of the head of state in November 1862. It was the first referendum ever held in Greece.

Prince Alfred turned down the Kingship and Prince William of Denmark, the second son of Prince Christian of Denmark (the Danish heir-presumptive), was elected by the National Assembly to become King George I of the Hellenes.

The monarchy was abolished in 1924 and replaced by the Second Hellenic Republic.

Second Hellenic Republic

The Hellenic Republic was proclaimed on 25 March 1924, in the aftermath of Greece's defeat by Turkey in the Asia Minor Campaign, which was widely blamed on the royalist government. During its brief existence, the Second Republic proved unstable. Greek society continued to be divided, as it was since the National Schism, between the pro-Republican Venizelists and the monarchists represented by the People's Party, who refused to acknowledge even the legitimacy of the Republic.

The cleavage in society extended to cultural and social issues such as differences over the use of Greek language to architectural styles. To this polarization was added the destabilizing involvement of the military in politics which resulted in several coups and attempted coups. The economy was in ruins following a decade of warfare and was unable to support the 1.5 million refugees from the population exchange with Turkey.

Despite the efforts of the reformist government of Eleftherios Venizelos in 1928–1932, the Great Depression had a disastrous impact on Greece's economy. The electoral victory of the People's Party in 1933, and two failed Venizelist coups, paved the way to the restoration of the reign of King George II.

House of Glücksburg (restored)

In 1935, Prime Minister Georgios Kondylis, a former pro-Venizelos military officer, became the most powerful political figure in Greece. He compelled Panagis Tsaldaris to resign as Prime Minister and took over the government, suspending many constitutional provisions in the process. Kondylis, who had now joined the Conservatives, decided to hold a referendum in order to re-establish the monarchy, despite the fact that he used to be a supporter of the anti-monarchist wing of Greek politics.

The monarchy was again abolished in 1973 and replaced by a republic. After the fall of the Greek junta in July 1974, the government held another referendum in December 1974 with the result being (again) to confirm the abolition of the monarchy and to establish the Third Hellenic Republic.

Timeline of kings of Greece

See also

Greek crown jewels
Greek royal family
List of Greek regents
List of Greek royal consorts
List of heads of state of Greece
Monarchy of Greece

Notes

References

 
Kings of Greece
Greece
Kings
Heads of state of Greece